Edoarda Vesselovsky (born 23 October 1940), better known by her stage name  Edy Vessel, Edi Vessel, or Edy Vesel, is an Italian actress and businesswoman.

Biography 
Vesselovsky was born in Trieste in 1940. In her youth, she worked as a model in the local boutiques while attending school. She landed a part as a chorus girl in a Wanda Osiris revue, where she was discovered by Mario Mattoli, who cast her in her debut film role in the 1959 film Guardatele ma non toccatele [Look, But Don't Touch].

This was followed by a dozen films, culminating with a role in Fellini's 8½. After this film, Vessel abandoned her film career.

Personal life
In 1965 Vessel started a relationship with Italian businessman ; once he obtained the annulment of his first marriage from the Roman Rota, the couple married in 1970. Heavily implicated in a bribery scandal involving Lockheed Corporation' s alleged bribery of government officials to induce the purchase of Lockheed planes, Crociani moved the whole family to Mexico. Upon Crociani's death in 1980, Vessel remarried to Count Pierluigi Vitalini and assumed control of Crociani's company Ciset (later to become Vitrociset), resulting in a court battle with Crociani's children from his first marriage.

Filmography 
 Guardatele ma non toccatele (Mario Mattoli, 1959) - Maggie
 Il raccomandato di ferro (Marcello Baldi, 1959)
 Tipi da spiaggia (Mario Mattoli, 1959) - Lucy
 Un dollaro di fifa (Giorgio Simonelli, 1960)
 The Passionate Thief (Mario Monicelli, 1960) - La ragazza
 The Thief of Baghdad (Arthur Lubin and Bruno Vailati, 1961) - Kadeejah
 Sword of the Conqueror (Carlo Campogalliani, 1961) - Matilda
 The Trojan Horse (Giorgio Ferroni, 1961) - Helen
 Psycosissimo (Steno, 1962) - Annalisa Michelotti
 Seven Seas to Calais (Primo Zeglio, 1962) - Arabella Ducleau
 8½ (Federico Fellini, 1963) - L'indossatrice
 Rocambole (Bernard Borderie, 1963) - Cléo Santelli (singer) (final film role)

References

External links 

 

Italian film actresses
20th-century Italian actresses
Businesspeople from Trieste
Italian countesses
Actors from Trieste
1940 births
Living people